Sharon Parker may refer to:

 Sharon K. Parker, Australian organisational psychologist and academic
 Hawkwoman (Sharon Parker), a DC comics character

See also
 Sharon Barker (born 1949), Canadian-American women's rights activist